Loro may refer to:

Loro Ciuffenna, in the Province of Arezzo, Tuscany
Loro Piceno, in the Province of Macerata, Marche
Loro language of Nigeria
Loro (film), an Italian film directed by Paolo Sorrentino
"Loro", a song by the US rock band Pinback
 Lobe on receive only, a radar tracking method